Bourke Shire is a local government area in the Orana region of New South Wales, Australia. The Shire is located adjacent to the Darling River, which is known as the Barwon River upstream from Bourke; and located adjacent to the Mitchell Highway. The northern boundary of the Shire is located adjacent to the border between New South Wales and Queensland. The shire is a wool and beef producing area.

The Mayor of Bourke Shire Council is Cr. Barry Hollman, an unaligned politician.

History

The Bourke LGA (local government area) was traditionally home to around fifteen Aboriginal groups. The people of the region were traditionally hunter-gatherers as well as seed harvesters, who managed the environment. These traditional landowners have been identified as belonging to five main groups, the Ngiyampaa, Barranbinya, Paruntji, Naualko, and Muruwari peoples. Aboriginal people consulted for a 2019 Aboriginal heritage study identified the Bourke LGA as the traditional country of the Barkindji people, Bardaji people, Murrawari (Muruwari) people, Nyemba (Ngiyampaa) people, and Nyirrpa people, who each occupied different areas. The boundaries of the land they occupied were defined largely by rivers, landforms, and areas of access to seasonal environmental resources.

Main towns and villages

Bourke Shire includes Bourke and the very small outback towns of Byrock, Enngonia, Fords Bridge, Wanaaring and Louth.

Demographics

According to the Australian Bureau of Statistics during 2003–04 there:
 were 1,062 wage and salary earners (ranked 141st in New South Wales and 457th in Australia, less than 0.1% of both New South Wales's 2,558,415 and Australia's 7,831,856)
 was a total income of $36 million (ranked 137th in New South Wales and 449th in Australia, less than 0.1% of both New South Wales's $107 billion and Australia's $304 billion)
 was an estimated average income per wage and salary earner of $33,611 (ranked 88th in New South Wales and 298th in Australia, 81% of New South Wales's $41,407 and 87% of Australia's $38,820)
 was an estimated median income per wage and salary earner of $32,426 (ranked 71st in New South Wales and 235th in Australia, 91% of New South Wales's $35,479 and 95% of Australia's $34,149).

Council

Current composition and election method

Bourke Shire Council is composed of ten Councillors elected proportionally as a single ward. All Councillors are elected for a fixed four-year term of office. The Mayor is elected by the Councillors at the first meeting of the council. The most recent election was held on 10 September 2016, and the makeup of the council is as follows:

The current Council, elected in 2021, in order of election, is:

Notable persons 

In 1884, Sid 'Combo' Ross set a record by shearing nine lambs in nine minutes.

Scottish-Australian poet balladeer Will. H. Ogilvie (1869–1963) worked on Belalie Station on the Warrego River, composed many of his poems in the 1890s.  Belalie is between the township of Enngonia (formerly Eringunia) and the Queensland border.

References 

 
Local government areas of New South Wales